Carvolth Exchange is a bus loop and park and ride facility serving northwestern Langley Township, British Columbia, Canada. TransLink is the primary operator of the exchange, with routes to Surrey City Centre, New Westminster, Burnaby, Maple Ridge and Langley City, which provide connections to SkyTrain and the West Coast Express rail services for travel towards Vancouver. A single BC Transit route is also operated with service to Abbotsford, Chilliwack and Burnaby.

History
The exchange opened on December 1, 2012, coinciding with the opening of the second Port Mann Bridge. Prior to opening, the area was served by the Walnut Grove Park and Ride.

On April 6, 2015, the Chilliwack Transit System began operating the 66 Fraser Valley Express for BC Transit with service to Abbotsford and Chilliwack. Carvolth Exchange served as the western terminus of this route until March 27, 2022, when service was further extended west to Lougheed Town Centre station in Burnaby.

Routes
, the following routes serve Carvolth Exchange:

See also
List of bus routes in Metro Vancouver

References

External links

TransLink (British Columbia) bus stations
Transport in Langley, British Columbia (district municipality)
2012 establishments in British Columbia